Jersey Dutch (Duits) was a Dutch dialect formerly spoken in and around the counties of Bergen and Passaic in New Jersey from the late 17th century until the early 20th century. It evolved in one of the two Dutch-speaking enclaves that remained for over two centuries after the dissolution of Dutch control in North America, the other (around Albany, New York) giving rise to Mohawk Dutch. It may have been a partial creole language based on Zeelandic and West Flemish Dutch dialects with English and possibly some elements of Lenape.

The Jersey Dutch language was spoken by the Jersey Dutch, the descendants of New Netherlanders who settled in Bergen, New Netherland, in 1630, and by Black slaves and free people of color also residing in that region, as well as the American Indian people known as the Ramapough Lenape Nation.

Etymology
The term "Dutch" originally referred to all Germanic language speakers. The English settlers referred to the Dutch language spoken by the New York and Jersey Dutch as low Dutch (Dutch: laag duits), and the language spoken by the Pennsylvania Dutch in Pennsylvania as high Dutch (German: hochdeutsch).

Varieties

By the mid-eighteenth century, according to one estimate, up to 20% of the population of the areas of New Jersey with "a strong Dutch element" were enslaved people. Blacks who grew up in insular Dutch communities (such as Sojourner Truth) were raised speaking the Dutch language, or adopted it later in life, to speak both with their white Dutch-descendant counterparts and with each other. Some Blacks during this period spoke Dutch as their primary or only language, and for some knowing the language was a point of pride:"They were Dutch and proud of it. I can remember my Aunt Sebania telling me about her great-grandmother, a stern old lady who both spoke and understood English, but who refused to speak it except in the privacy of her home. In public she spoke Dutch, as any proper person should do, a dignified language."Some contemporary reports from white speakers of Jersey Dutch reported a distinct variety of the language unique to the Black population, which they called  ("Negro Dutch", not to be confused with the Dutch creole ). This term was used both for the speech of the Ramapough (a distinct community of Black, white, and Lenape descent), and of other Blacks in Bergen County. 

However, as attestation of Jersey Dutch from Black and Ramapough speakers is scarce, scholars disagree whether negerduits can be considered a distinct variety. Sojourner Truth's Dutch, for example, was described by her owner's daughter around 1810 as "very similar to that of the unlettered white people of her time." The only contemporaneous linguistic treatment of Jersey Dutch draws primarily on the speech of three white Jersey Dutch speakers and one Ramapough speaker, and notes phonetic, syntactic, and lexical differences between the two groups.

Phonology

Vowels 
The vowel system of Jersey Dutch differs markedly from Standard Dutch, as well as from the Dutch dialects from which it derives, perhaps due to the influence of American English. The following chart is based on the speech of two white Jersey Dutch speakers recorded in 1910 and 1941 respectively. Parentheses "indicate that the vowel is attested in few forms."

Consonants 
Jersey Dutch consonants are largely the same as those of Standard Dutch, with a few exceptions.

Example

An example of Jersey Dutch, transcribed in 1913, spoken by Matthew Hicks of Mahwah, the white sexton of a Dutch church.

Jersey Dutch

Standard Modern Dutch
Below is a word-by-word translation of the Jersey Dutch quote, rather than a fluent Dutch rendering.

English
The prodigal son:
A man had two sons; the one stayed at home; 
the other went abroad from home to make his fortune. 
He was not content at home and therefore then he became poor. 
He thought about it at home and his father’s place. 
Then said: I shall go home. My father has plenty.

See also
 List of Bergen, New Netherland placename etymologies
 Mohawk Dutch
Dutch-based creole languages

Notes

References
  Handboek der Nederlandsche taal: Deel I. De sociologische structuur der Nederlandsche taal I., Jac. van Ginneken and L.C.G. Malmberg, 's-Hertogenbosch, Netherlands. 1928. Chapter 10: Het Amerikaansch.
  Ik was te bissie...Nederlanders en hun taal in de Verenigde Staten: 2.3 Het taalgebruik van de 17e-eeuwse immigranten en hun nakomelingen, Jo Daan, De Walburg Pers. 2007.  (Click on link and then scroll down.)
Mencken, H.L. The American Language. 1921. Appendix II - Non-English Dialects in America: Dutch

Further reading
 Bachman, Van Cleaf. 1982. ‘The story of the Low Dutch language’. De Halve Maen 56: 3, 1–3, 21; 57: 1, 10–13.
 Bachman, Van Cleaf. 1983. ‘What is Low Dutch?’ De Halve Maen 57: 3, 14–17, 23–24.
 Buccini, Anthony F. 1995. ‘The Dialectical Origins of New Netherland Dutch’. Dutch Linguistics in a Changing Europe. The Berkeley Conference on Dutch Linguistics 1993. Ed. by Thomas Shannon & Johan P. Snapper. Lanham etc., 211–263. (Publications of the American Association for Netherlandic Studies, 8).
 Noordegraaf, Jan. 2008. 'Nederlands in Noord-Amerika. Over de studie van het Laag Nederlands (Low Dutch)'. Trefwoord, tijdschrift voor lexicografie, December 2008, 1-29. (https://web.archive.org/web/20040215024441/http://www.fryske-akademy.nl/trefwoord/.)
 Prince, J. Dyneley. 1913. ‘A text in Jersey Dutch’. Tijdschrift voor Nederlandsche Taal en Letterkunde 32, 306–312.
 Scheltema, Gajus and Westerhuijs, Heleen (eds.),Exploring Historic Dutch New York. Museum of the City of New York/Dover Publications, New York (2011) 
 Storms, James B.H. 1964. A Jersey Dutch vocabulary. Park Ridge, N.J.: Pascack Historical Society

Languages of New York (state)
Languages of New Jersey
Bergen County, New Jersey
Dutch-American culture in New Jersey
Dutch-based pidgins and creoles
Dutch language in the United States
Extinct languages of North America
Passaic County, New Jersey
Ramapough Mountain Indians
Languages attested from the 17th century
Languages extinct in the 20th century
Languages of the African diaspora